Ağdaş or Aghdash or Aqdash or Aq Dash or Agdash may refer to:

Ağdaş, Azerbaijan, a city in Azerbaijan, capital of the Agdash District
Agdash District, Azerbaijan, an administrative region
Ağdaş, Jalilabad, Azerbaijan
Ağdaş, Kalbajar, Azerbaijan
Agdash Abbasabad, a summer camp in Khoda Afarin County, Iran
Aqdash-e Olya, a village in Ardabil Province, Iran
Aqdash-e Sofla, a village in Ardabil Province, Iran
Aq Dash, East Azerbaijan, a village in Tabriz County, East Azerbaijan Province, Iran
Aqdash, Khondab, a village in Khondab County, Markazi Province, Iran
Aqdash, Saveh, a village in Saveh County, Markazi Province, Iran
Aq Dash, Hamadan, a village in Hamadan County, Hamadan Province, Iran
Aqdash, Kabudarahang, a village in Kabudarahang County, Hamadan Province, Iran
Aqdash, Shirin Su, a village in Kabudarahang County, Hamadan Province, Iran
Aghdash, Isfahan, a village in Isfahan Province, Iran
Aqdash, Kalat, a village in Kalat County, Razavi Khorasan Province, Iran
Aq Dash, Torbat-e Heydarieh, a village in Kalat County, Razavi Khorasan Province, Iran
Aghdash, Chaldoran, West Azerbaijan Province, Iran
Aghdash, Khoy, West Azerbaijan Province, Iran
Aghdash, Miandoab, West Azerbaijan Province, Iran